Ward O’Neill (born 1951) is an Australian illustrator, caricaturist and cartoonist, who has contributed to a variety of newspapers, including The London Daily Mail, The Australian, Sydney Morning Herald, National Times, the Bulletin and Australian Financial Review. His credits include Walkley Awards for illustration in 1982, 1984 and 1986.

External links
 Financial Review Cartoon Gallery
 Ward O'Neill collection held and digitised by the National Library of Australia

Australian editorial cartoonists
1951 births
Living people